Pivitplex is five-piece alternative Christian rock band from Nashville, Tennessee, although the band was started in Montana, originally under the name Porchlight.

Discography

Albums

Singles

Videography

Filmography
 The Pivitplex Show (TV) - 2006 - Themselves

Band members

Current
Scott Brownson - lead vocals, rhythm guitar
Joby Rudolph - lead guitar, vocals
Alex Hicks - guitar, vocals
Phillip Hicks - bass
Levi Stugelmeyer - drums
Ryan Penn - Vocals, Harmonica, spoons

Former members
Josh Ogle - bass
James Calk - Drums
Eddie Frank - Lead Guitar
Scott Wilber - Drums

Alternative rock groups from Tennessee
Christian rock groups from Tennessee
Musical groups established in 1999
1999 establishments in Tennessee